Dorothy Hughes may refer to:

 Dorothy B. Hughes (1904–1993), American crime writer and literary critic
 Dorothy Hughes (architect) (1910–1987), Kenyan architect, politician, social reformer and disability activist
 Dorothy Pitman Hughes (born 1938), feminist, child-welfare advocate and African-American activist